Singer Presents Elvis Singing Flaming Star and Others is a compilation album by American singer and musician Elvis Presley, released by RCA Records on October 1, 1968. It spent five months available only at select retail stores featuring products by the Singer Sewing Machine Company as a promotional tie-in with Presley's upcoming Christmas television special on the NBC network, which Singer had sponsored. It was reissued for normal retail channels as Elvis Sings Flaming Star in April 1969, becoming the first Elvis Presley budget album on the RCA Camden  label, catalogue CAS 2304. The 1969 release peaked at number 96 on the Billboard 200 album chart. It was certified Gold on July 15, 1999, and Platinum on January 6, 2004, by the Recording Industry Association of America.

Due to the chart success of this album upon reissue in 1969, RCA Records elected to release more Presley titles on the Camden label through 1972. These budget LPs were shorter than the standard running time, featuring some unused soundtrack recordings and previously released items.

Content
All tracks were compiled from sessions for Presley film soundtracks, with the exception of "Tiger Man" from the Singer Christmas Special. The cover of Chuck Berry's "Too Much Monkey Business" was a warm-up at a session for film songs to Stay Away, Joe. Excepting "Flaming Star," the title song from Presley's 1960 movie of the same title which had been released on the Elvis by Request: Flaming Star and 3 Other Great Songs extended play single in February 1961, all tracks were previously unreleased.

The "Texas" medley and "All I Needed Was the Rain" appeared in Viva Las Vegas (1964) and Stay Away, Joe (1968), respectively, while "Wonderful World" appeared over the opening credits to Live a Little, Love a Little (1968). "Flaming Star" had been one of only two songs performed in that film. The live performance of "Tiger Man" was held off the initial broadcast of the NBC television special, but replaced the segment with "Blue Christmas" for the repeat broadcast of the special in the summer of 1969. This track has the distinction of being the first live recording by Elvis ever commercially released. The remaining songs were not actually used in their respective films.

Reissues
Flaming Star was reissued in 1975 by Pickwick Records, and again on compact disc by Sony/RCA in 2006.

Track listing

Note
RCA originally released the song "Flaming Star" on the extended play single Elvis by Request: Flaming Star and 3 Other Great Songs (RCA LPC 128), which peaked at number 14 on the Billboard Hot 100 chart.

Charts

Album

Certifications and sales

See also
 Elvis for Everyone 1965 album
 Let's Be Friends 1970 album

References

External links

PRS-279 Singer Presents Elvis Singing Flaming Star and Others Guide part of The Elvis Presley Record Research Database

1968 compilation albums
Elvis Presley compilation albums
RCA Records compilation albums